Lesley Cheam Wei Yeng (born 1995/1996) is a Malaysian beauty pageant titleholder who was crowned Miss Universe Malaysia 2022. She represented her country in the Miss Universe 2022 pageant.

Early life and background
Cheam was born in Selangor, Malaysia. She obtained bachelor's degree in pharmaceutical and health science from University of Nottingham Malaysia in 2019 before pursuing a career in marketing.

Pageantry

Miss Universe 2022 
She represented Malaysia at Miss Universe 2022 competition in New Orleans, US on 14 January 2023 but was unplaced.

References 

Living people
Malaysian female models
Malaysian socialites
Malaysian beauty pageant winners
Miss Universe Malaysia
Miss Universe 2022 contestants
Year of birth missing (living people)